Felice Leonardo (9 March 1915 – 15 April 2015) was an Italian prelate of Roman Catholic Church. At the age of 100, he was one of the oldest Roman Catholic bishops. Since the death of Cardinal Ersilio Tonini, he also was the oldest Roman Catholic bishop from Italy.

Biography 
Leonardo was born in Pietramelara, Italy in 1915. He was ordained a priest on 24 July 1938, appointed bishop on 22 July 1957 to the Telese o Cerreto Sannita Diocese, and consecrated on 29 September 1957.

On 21 March 1984, Leonardo was appointed to the Diocese of Sant'Agata de' Goti, then to the Roman Catholic Diocese of Cerreto Sannita-Telese-Sant’Agata de’ Goti when the diocese of Telese o Cerreto Sannita and the Diocese of Sant'Agata de' Goti united on 29 September 1986.

Leonardo retired as Bishop of Diocese of Cerreto Sannita-Telese-Sant’Agata de’ Goti on 20 July 1991.

External links and additional sources
 (Chronology of Bishops)
 (Chronology of Bishops)
Catholic-Hierarchy

1915 births
2015 deaths
Italian centenarians
People from Caserta
20th-century Italian Roman Catholic bishops
Participants in the Second Vatican Council
Men centenarians